La Plata is a town and municipality in the Huila Department, Colombia with a population of 57.381 inhabitants including the rural area at an altitude of 1,050 m. It is located 122 km away from Neiva, 147 km from the city of Popayán and 210 km from the town of San Agustín.

The municipality is located in the southwestern part of the department of Huila, in the foothills of the Cordillera Central, is geographically situated at coordinates 2 ° 23'00" North Latitude and 75 ° 56'00" West Longitude.

The municipality is bordered on the north by the Cauca Department, on the south by the municipality of La Argentina, on the east by the municipalities of Paicol and Pital and the west by the Cauca Department.

History 
The foundation and establishment as a municipality dates from June 5, 1651 by Captain Diego de Ospina y Maldonado, at which organizes the parish of San Sebastián de La Plata. This foundation is attributed to the passage of Sebastián de Belalcázar for the lands of the Cauca in the search for El Dorado on the connection between Santa Fe and Quito, and the interest result of the Spanish to the discovery of mines silver existing in this area. Over time, the city has witnessed three foundations the first given by the insurrection of the Spanish crown on October 22, 1553, the second due to the extraction and trade of silver in early 1554 and the third because to destruction by the Indians Paez Andaquíes and Yalcones on June 17, 1577. La Plata is a historic town, it was visited by Simón Bolívar on several occasions as he headed to spend time in nearby plantations. Close to the city there is a religious pilgrimage site called ′la Quiebra Milagrosa′.

History of the Cathedral of San Sebastian de La Plata 
La Plata's parish since the nineteenth century, several churches have been built but all were of modest proportions, only in the early twentieth century the imposing building starts now exists. The first stone was laid by Archbishop Lopez's father being parish priest Emigdio Artunduaga the October 3, 1934 and the blessing and consecration of Bishop Martinez made the April 29, 1957. The Temple of San Sebastian is an architectural synthesis with qualities that stand out as one of the best in Colombia: beauty, grandeur, slim, height, width, abundance of light and perfection in the set. It has three naves in harmonious whole. In the front stand, the two sides two bold towers 52 meters high, on the back silver dome rises nearly hemispherical with large windows, on the front dihedral summit of the central nave climbs a statue San Sebastian gigantea height of 5.40 meters in four niches in the front of the main wall are the statues of San Pablo, San Pedro, San Juan Bosco and Our Lady. The length of the ship is 60 meters. And the width of 30 meters. At the bottom of the aisles is artistically made and decorated altars. The altar is a combination of exquisite niche in a set of columns, arches and frieze with three images of perfect stylization, one of which, the plant, is the patron Saint Sebastian. The light penetrates extensively and refracts on the walls and the polished golden acanthus column and illuminated with pictures of the ordeal diaphanous and beautiful pictures. The candlesticks, candles and chandeliers enhance the clarity of the large sanctuary. The reliefs of the Evangelists on the vivid polychrome dome mystically enchant

Sociocultural context 
La Plata is a town wide historic tradition that dates from the discovery itself of the department of Huila. Its strategic location in the system of regional relations makes it a meeting place and crossroads which prints high dynamics of urban renewal while maintaining the traditions that have preserved for so many years.

Sites of Interes Culture General
The main attractions are the National Park Puracé, Moscopan monolithic statuary, statuary Aguabonita, Laguna de San Rafael, San Andres lagoon, the river of silver, Custodio García Rovira park, the park pola, the sulfur waterfall, the Cascade hop Candelaria, the monkey waterfall, waterfalls and San Nicolas Bedon, thermal San Sebastian, San Sebastian Cathedral, and the temple in San Andres pierdra.

Ecology 
The ecosystem is an important wildlife value, presenting a rich biodiversity including birds, antelope, plantigrade (spectacled bears), Snakes (jackets and coral), some smaller cats (ocelot) and other minor species. The Natural Park buffer zone of the Nevado del Huila, constitutes the most important ecosystem for the city of Palermo, accounting for biodiversity in woodland size and high water potential. San Isidro with an area of 412.5 hectares, located on the sidewalks Horizonte, Viso and Florida between 2,400 and 2,700 m, which corresponds to the municipality and is shared with the town of Teruel. It is a vacant lot consisting of secondary forest species Cedro intervened Black, Butter, Apple, White Yarumo, tree ferns, palm Boa, among others, in addition, some animal species such as Pava Guiche, Tigrillo, Cuzumbo, foxes, mice, Squirrels, Bats, etc.

Tourism 
Waterfall Azufrada Dos Aguas Archaeological Zone: Located in the inspection of San Vicente,  Thermal Cascada San Sebastian de la Mona: take the name from the water source to the form Private Reserve Meremberg:means "sea of mountains'region is the largest source of municipal water, and there are natural forests cedar Oak, Charum, Igua pink encerillo, candles, and lagoons and swamps.  Cascada de La Candelaria: falling over 150 meters high.

Economy 
Livestock sector: the municipality are located in two strips parallel to the warm areas between the 460 meters to 1,200 meters and the cold zone 1,800 to 2,500 masl with a total area of 56,460 hectares. As the main production systems of dual purpose cattle, agriculture, aquaculture (warm and cold), pig and other minor economic importance. Agricultural Economic Sector Agriculture is one of the most important lines in the economy of the municipality. This economy is represented mainly by rice, coffee / banana, banana, cacao / banana, corn, sugarcane, beans, potatoes, and some fruits such as lulus, tree tomato and blackberry, beautiful hymn of the municipality of La Plata, Huila, Colombia.

Educatión

Public and private schools 
 Departmental Marillac Educational Institution
 Educational Institution San Sebastian
 Agricultural Technical Educational Institution
 Educational Institution Luis Carlos Trujillo Polanco
 Educational Institution Misael Pastrana Borrero
 Business School of the Andes.
 Creative World School
 School Evita Roso de Palacios
 Modern Lyceum Plateño
 José Celestino Mutis Institute.

higher education 
 SENA
 Universidad Surcolombiana
 UNAD Universidad Nacional Abierta y a Distancia
 Universidad Minuto de Dios
 Corporación Universitaria Remington

Anthem Municipality of La Plata
Plateñas Nights
Perfume and stars 
be wearing evening while 
dancing with the crests and swings flowers 
With rumors running 
the river birds fell asleep 
lilies will bloom the Rosas and orange 
(a)I will always remember nights plateñas 
and the great reception from his 
lordship Huila plateau Dona Ana Julia
is the traditional big Tolima 
The echo of laughter and songs 
murmur pour into the island from which 
watchful sentinel image San Sebastian 
impressive rises Cross 
the night air hits me 
Fresh Faceare the breezes 
that come from Coconuco 
or are breezes that come from 
traditions that surround 
Puracé beyond
the beautiful 
night Plateñas Cauca not forget.

References

External links
 La Plata official website
  Vista satelital del área urbana de La Plata enWikiMapia

Municipalities of Huila Department